Gerarda ("Gerda") Maria Kraan (born 30 July 1933) is a retired female middle distance runner from the Netherlands, who twice represented her native country at the Summer Olympics: 1960 (Rome) and 1964 (Tokyo).  In 1962 she won the gold medal in the women's 800 metres race at the 1962 European Championships in Belgrade.

Kraan is the oldest sibling in a family of 14 children. Initially she trained in handball, while working as a police officer, and changed to athletics only in 1954, aged 21. At her first major race in 1958 she improved the Dutch record in the 800 m to 2,16.6. She shaved another 8 seconds from it the next year, and in 1960 qualified for the Olympics, where she was eliminated in a preliminary round. After that she worked hard to improve her running technique and fitness, winning five national titles and setting nine national 800 m records between 1958 and 1963. During that period she also competed in 400 m, 440 yd and 880 yd races. In 1962 she won the 800 m European title with a new European record of 2,02.8. At the next Olympics in 1964 she finished in seventh place in the final of the 800 m.

References

1933 births
Living people
Dutch female middle-distance runners
Athletes (track and field) at the 1960 Summer Olympics
Athletes (track and field) at the 1964 Summer Olympics
European Athletics Championships medalists
Olympic athletes of the Netherlands
Sportspeople from Leiden
20th-century Dutch women
21st-century Dutch women